The Detroit Pulaski Post Five were an American basketball team based in Detroit, Michigan that was a member of the American Basketball League.

The team became known as the Detroit Lions after the beginning of the 1926/27 season and dropped out of the league after 6 games in that season.

Year-by-year

Basketball teams in Detroit